Rajakaruna Mohotti Appuhamillage piyadasa Sarathchandra Rajakaruna (known as Sarath Chandra Rajakaruna; 22 July 1940 – 10 January 2011) was a Sri Lankan politician and a former member of the Parliament of Sri Lanka.

Members of the 9th Parliament of Sri Lanka
Members of the 10th Parliament of Sri Lanka
Members of the 12th Parliament of Sri Lanka
Members of the 13th Parliament of Sri Lanka
United National Party politicians
2011 deaths
1940 births
Ministers of state of Sri Lanka
Non-cabinet ministers of Sri Lanka
Deputy ministers of Sri Lanka